Drosophila acanthoptera is a species of fly in the genus Drosophila, whose females seldom remate.

References 

acanthoptera
Insects described in 1949